Sara Lawrence was a beauty pageant contestant.

Sara Lawrence may also refer to:

Sara Lawrence (writer)
Sara Lawrence-Lightfoot

See also
Sarah Lawrence (disambiguation)